Ricardo Adolfo de la Guardia Arango (14 March 1899 – 29 December 1969) was the 11th President of Panama from October 9, 1941 to June 15, 1945, during World War II. He also served as governor of Panamá Province from 1936 to 1938. His government was the first Latin American government to declare war on the Axis Powers following the attack on Pearl Harbor, and he allowed the United States to lease military bases across the country.

References

1899 births
1969 deaths
Panamanian Roman Catholics
Presidents of Panama
World War II political leaders
20th-century Panamanian politicians
20th-century Roman Catholics